Anthony Misiewicz (born November 1, 1994) is an American professional baseball pitcher for the St. Louis Cardinals of Major League Baseball (MLB). He has previously played in MLB for the Seattle Mariners and Kansas City Royals.

Career

Amateur career
Misiewicz graduated from Anchor Bay High School in Fair Haven, Michigan. He attended Michigan State University, where he played college baseball for the Michigan State Spartans. In 2015, his junior year, he had a 5–4 win–loss record with a 3.80 earned run average (ERA) in 18 games (eight games started). After the season, he briefly played collegiate summer baseball with the Cotuit Kettleers of the Cape Cod Baseball League.

Seattle Mariners
The Seattle Mariners selected Misiewicz in the 18th round of the 2015 MLB draft. He signed with the Mariners for a $70,000 signing bonus rather than returning to Michigan State for his senior year.

After signing, Misiewicz made his professional debut with the Everett AquaSox, going 3–2 with a 2.14 ERA in  innings pitched. In 2016, he pitched for the Bakersfield Blaze, compiling a 7–10 record with a 4.79 ERA in 29 starts. He began 2017 with Modesto Nuts before being promoted to the Arkansas Travelers.

Tampa Bay Rays
On August 6, 2017, the Mariners traded Misiewicz, Luis Rengifo, and a player to be named later to the Tampa Bay Rays for Mike Marjama and Ryan Garton. He was assigned to the Montgomery Biscuits. In 28 total starts between Modesto, Arkansas, and Montgomery, he went 11–6 with a 4.51 ERA.

Second stint with Mariners
After the season, the Mariners reacquired Misiewicz from the Rays for an international signing bonus slot. In 2018, he returned to play for Arkansas, pitching to a 3–12 record and 5.51 ERA in 21 starts. He missed nearly a month during the season due to injury. Misiewicz began 2019 with Arkansas before being promoted to the Tacoma Rainers. Over 26 games (24 starts), he went 9–8 with a 4.59 ERA, striking out 125 over  innings.

On July 24, 2020, Misiewicz made his major league debut against the Houston Astros, giving up one run in one inning. For the season, he was 0–2 with a 4.05 ERA. On July 31, 2022, Misiewicz was designated for assignment.

Kansas City Royals 
On August 1, 2022, Misiewicz was traded to the Kansas City Royals for cash considerations. He appeared in 15 games for the Royals down the stretch, logging a 1-1 record and 4.11 ERA with 19 strikeouts in 15.1 innings pitched.

On February 3, 2023, Misiewicz was designated for assignment by Kansas City after the signing of Zack Greinke was made official.

St Louis Cardinals
On February 8, 2023, Misiewicz was traded to the St. Louis Cardinals in exchange for cash considerations.

References

External links

1994 births
Living people
Baseball players from Detroit
Major League Baseball pitchers
Seattle Mariners players
Kansas City Royals players
Michigan State Spartans baseball players
Cotuit Kettleers players
Everett AquaSox players
Bakersfield Blitz players
Modesto Nuts players
Arkansas Travelers players
Montgomery Biscuits players
Arizona League Mariners players
Peoria Javelinas players
Tacoma Rainiers players